Barh Azoum is one of three departments in Salamat, a region of Chad. Its capital is Am Timan.

Departments of Chad
Salamat Region